Windhand is an American doom metal band formed in Richmond, Virginia, in 2008. Currently signed to Relapse Records, Windhand released their most recent album, Eternal Return, in October 2018.

History 
Windhand formed in 2008 with singer Dorthia Cottrell, guitarists Asechiah Bogdan (formerly of Alabama Thunderpussy) and Garrett Morris, bassist Nathan Hilbish and drummer Jeff Loucks.

In 2010, they released a two-song demo titled Practice Space Demo. Loucks was then replaced by former The Might Could drummer Ryan Wolfe. The band signed with Forcefield Records and released their eponymous debut album in 2012. Hilbish left the band and was replaced by Parker Chandler. Shortly after, the band left Forcefield and signed to Relapse Records, which released their second album, Soma, in 2013. The album reached No. 24 on the Billboard Heatseekers Albums chart, making it the band's first release to make a Billboard chart, and was named one of the year's best heavy metal albums by Rolling Stone.

In 2013, Windhand released the split album Reflection of the Negative with Cough and another with the band Salem's Pot, simply titled Windhand / Salem's Pot, followed by the live album Live at Roadburn 2014 the next year. In 2015, with Jack Endino as producer, they recorded and released their third album, Grief's Infernal Flower, which peaked at No. 16 on the Billboard Hard Rock Albums chart and No. 7 on the Billboard Heatseekers chart, and was named the 17th-best album of 2015 by Consequence of Sound. Founding guitarist Asechiah Bogdan then left the band and was not replaced.

In early 2018, Windhand released the split EP Windhand / Satan's Satyrs with fellow Virginia band Satan's Satyrs. This EP reached No. 11 on the Billboard Heatseekers Albums chart. Their fourth full-length album, Eternal Return, again with Endino producing, was released in October 2018. That album reached No. 3 on the Billboard Heatseekers Albums chart.

Members

Current members 
 Dorthia Cottrell – vocals (2008–present)
 Garrett Morris – guitars (2008–present)
 Ryan Wolfe – drums (2010–present)
 Parker Chandler – bass (2013–present)

Former members 
 Nathan Hilbish – bass (2008–2013)
 Jeff Loucks – drums (2008–2010)
 Asechiah Bogdan – guitars (2009–2015)

Discography

Demos 
 Practice Space Demo (independent, 2010)

Studio albums 
 Windhand (Forcefield Records, 2012)
 Soma (Relapse Records, 2013) – No. 24 Billboard Heatseekers Albums
 Grief's Infernal Flower (Relapse Records, 2015) – No. 7 Billboard Heatseekers Albums, No. 17 Billboard Tastemaker Albums, No. 16 Billboard Hard Rock Albums, No. 39 Billboard Rock Albums
Eternal Return (Relapse Records, 2018)

Splits 
 Reflection of the Negative (Relapse Records, 2013) 
 Windhand / Salem's Pot (RidingEasy Records, 2014) 
 Windhand / Satan's Satyrs (Relapse Records, 2018)

Singles 
"Orchard" (Relapse Records, 2013)

Live albums 
 Live at Roadburn 2014 (Roadburn Records, 2014)
 Live Elsewhere (self-released, 2019)

References

External links 

Relapse Records artists
American doom metal musical groups
Musical groups established in 2009
Heavy metal musical groups from Virginia
Music of Richmond, Virginia